The NCAA Division I Men's Golf Championship, played in late May or early June, is the top annual competition in U.S. men's collegiate golf.

The teams that win their respective Division I conference championships are given automatic spots in the regionals. A selection committee decides which other teams play in the regionals. The top teams in each regional advance to the championship. In addition, the best player in each tournament from teams not qualified also advance to the next round as individual competitors.

It is a stroke play team competition; starting in 2009, the competition changed to a stroke play/match play competition with the top eight teams after 54 holes of stroke play being seeded and concluding with an eight-team match play playoff. An award is also given for the lowest-scoring individual competitor.

Many individual winners have gone on to have successful careers on the PGA Tour, including 1961 champion Jack Nicklaus, 1967 champion Hale Irwin, 1996 champion Tiger Woods, and three-time champions Ben Crenshaw and Phil Mickelson.

Results
Note: The NCAA was founded in 1906.  The first championship sponsored by the NCAA was in 1939.

Pre-NCAA era, match play (1897–1938) 
The NCAA started sponsoring the golf championship in 1939; the previous 41 championships were conferred by the National Intercollegiate Golf Association.
Team scores, individual scores, and course pars are not kept in official NCAA records before 1939.

NCAA era, match play (1939–1964)

NCAA era, stroke play (1965–2008)

NCAA era, stroke and match play (2009–present) 

§ Won via a playoff.

Non-American winners
Americans had captured all of the titles from the tournament's inception, until James McLean of Australia won in 1998. Luke Donald of England won in 1999. Alejandro Cañizares of Spain won in 2003, followed by James Lepp (2005) and Matt Hill (2009), both from Canada, and Thomas Pieters of Belgium in 2012.

Team titles
The Intercollegiate Golf Association (later named the National Intercollegiate Golf Association) sponsored the annual tournament and awarded titles from 1897 through 1938.  In 1939, the NCAA assumed tournament sponsorship and began awarding championship titles.

Schools are listed by their current names, which do not necessarily match those used when schools won their titles.

Multiple winners

Individual champion

These men have won more than one individual championship:
3: Ben Crenshaw, Phil Mickelson
2: Richard Crawford, Dexter Cummings, George Dunlap, Fred Lamprecht, Scott Simpson

Individual champion's school
These schools have produced more than one individual champion:
13 champions: Yale
10 champions: Oklahoma State
8 champions: Harvard, Houston
7 champions: Princeton
6 champions: Arizona State, Texas
5 champions: Ohio State
4 champions: Southern California
3 champions: Georgia Tech, LSU, Michigan, Stanford, Tulane, Wake Forest
2 champions: Clemson, Florida, Georgetown, Illinois, Minnesota, North Carolina, Oklahoma, Purdue, San Jose State, UNLV

Winners of both U.S. Amateur and collegiate titles
These men have won both the collegiate individual championship and the U.S. Amateur. Only Jack Nicklaus (1961), Phil Mickelson (1990), Tiger Woods (1996), Ryan Moore (2004), and Bryson DeChambeau (2015) have managed the feat in the same year.

See also
Palmer Cup
NAIA Men's Golf Championship

References

External links
NCAA men's golf
 

Division I
Golf, men